"Bring It All to Me" is a song performed by American R&B girl group Blaque. The song samples Shalamar's "I Don't Wanna Be the Last to Know". The remix and album version of the song features JC Chasez of boy band *NSYNC but is credited to the group as a whole. It was released on October 11, 1999, as Blaque's third single in the United States.

"Bring It All to Me" reached number five on the US Billboard Hot 100, number seven on the Canadian RPM Top Singles chart and number 16 on the New Zealand Singles Chart. Billboard named the song number 54 on their list of 100 Greatest Girl Group Songs of All Time.

Composition and background 
Musically, "Bring It All to Me" is a silky, slow-and-easy youth-leaning R&B track with a bouncing beat underneath "classy" piano keys. The song was described by music journalist Chuck Taylor of Billboard as sounding "distinctive and like an old-school anthem" and "refreshing" in terms of the track's lyrical content amidst the "male-bashing" anthems from the time. It moves at a tempo of 89 beats per minute in the key of F major. It also contains a sample of Shalamar’s 1980s single “I Don’t Want to Be the Last to Know”.

The album version with *NSYNC came about due to both groups sharing the same manager at the time and opening for *NSYNC on tour. Brandi D. revealed it was Justin Timberlake who was originally intended to sing on the song, but due to him filming Model Behavior at the time, JC Chasez sang instead.

Music video
The music video was directed by Bille Woodruff. The music video features a futuristic, sci-fi inspired feel. The video shows Blaque as alien girls with superpowers who descend on an downtown Los Angeles street. Male onlookers find a mysterious box and are transported to a futuristic world where they interact with the women. In this second setting, each member of Blaque is shown in a room with a different color: pink for Natina, green for Brandi, and orange for Shamari.

The video premiered on music video stations during autumn of 1999, starting off with MTV the week ending October 10, 1999. BET and The Box soon followed and began airing the week ending October 17, 1999.

For the music video, an alternative version of the song was used in place of the album version featuring vocals from JC Chasez. This version replaced Chasez vocals with Brandi Williams and Shamari DeVoe. The alternative version also features additional ad-libs from Natina Reed. This version has never been released.

The video is often noted for its influence and included as an example by fashion blogs and magazines for its Afro-futuristic, Y2K aesthetic.

Track listings
European CD single
 "Bring It All to Me" (main version) – 3:46
 "Bring It All to Me" (remix instrumental) – 4:12

European maxi-CD single
 "Bring It All to Me" (main version) – 3:46
 "Bring It All to Me" (remix) featuring 50 Cent – 4:09
 "Bring It All to Me" (Triple Threat Mix featuring Free, NY Glaze and Jazz-Ming Mackey) – 4:31
 "Bring It All to Me" (remix instrumental) – 4:12

European 12-inch single
A1. "Bring It All to Me" (remix) featuring 50 Cent – 4:09
A2. "Bring It All to Me" (Triple Threat Mix featuring Free, NY Glaze and Jazz-Ming Mackey) – 4:31
B1. "Bring It All to Me" (remix instrumental) – 4:12
B2. "Bring It All to Me" (Triple Threat Mix instrumental) – 4:32

Charts

Weekly charts

Year-end charts

Release history

References

External links
 Bring It All To Me lyrics at Lyrics.com

1999 singles
1999 songs
Blaque songs
Columbia Records singles
Dance-pop songs
JC Chasez songs
Song recordings produced by Cory Rooney
Song recordings produced by L.E.S. (record producer)
Songs written by Cory Rooney